Zadora (Płomień, Płomienie, Płomieńczyk) - is a Polish coat of arms used by the szlachta.

History
The coat of arms was created in the 12th century.

Blazon

Notable bearers
Notable bearers of this coat of arms include:
 Lanckoroński family
 
 Zbigniew z Brzezia
 Przecław Lanckoroński
 Stanisław Lanckoroński
 
 Mykolas Kęsgaila
 Stanislovas Kęsgaila

Variations

See also
 Polish heraldry
 Heraldic family
 List of Polish nobility coats of arms

Notes

Bibliography
 Tadeusz Gajl: Herbarz polski od średniowiecza do XX wieku : ponad 4500 herbów szlacheckich 37 tysięcy nazwisk 55 tysięcy rodów. L&L, 2007, s. 406-539. .

Zadora